The Sikhs are adherents to Sikhism the fifth largest organized religion in the world, with around 25 million adherents. Sikh History is around 500 years and in that time the Sikhs have developed unique expressions of art and culture which are influenced by their faith and synthesize traditions from many other cultures depending on the locality of the adherents of the religion. Sikhism is the only religion that originated in the Punjab region with all other religions coming from outside Punjab (with the possible exception of Punjabi Hinduism since the oldest Hindu scripture – the Rig Veda – was composed in the Punjab region.  Some other religions, like Jainism, may also claim to have originated in Punjab since Jain symbolism has been found among artifacts of the Indus Valley Civilization).  All the Sikh gurus, many saints and many of the martyrs in Sikh history were from Punjab and from the Punjabi people (as well as other parts of the Indian Subcontinent). Punjabi culture and Sikhism are mistakenly considered inseparably intertwined. "Sikh" properly refers to adherents of Sikhism as a religion, strictly not an ethnic group. However, because Sikhism has seldom sought converts, most Sikhs share strong ethno-religious ties as therefore it's a common stereotype that all Sikhs share the same ethnicity. Many countries, such as the U.K., therefore misconcievingly recognize Sikh as a designated ethnicity on their censuses. The American non-profit organization United Sikhs has fought to have Sikh included on the U.S. census as well, arguing that Sikhs "self-identify as an 'ethnic minority'" and believe "that they are more than just a religion".

History 

The earliest extant Sikh artwork appear in scriptural texts in the decoratively designed opening folios of the Goindwal pothi, dated to the third quarter of the 16th century during the period of Guru Amar Das. The scripture compiled by Guru Arjan in 1604, known as the Kartarpur Bir, features extensive illumination artwork. Later on, the Sikh gurus produced calligraphic Gurmukhi autographs of the Mul Mantar known as nishans, those belonging to gurus Arjan, Hargobind, Har Rai, Tegh Bahadur, and Gobind Singh have been identified and dated between 1600 and 1708. The written orders of the later gurus known as hukamnamas, were also decorated and inscribed with a calligraphic style. B.N. Goswamy argues that painting in the Punjab goes back to the 16th century and became influenced by the Mughal school in the early half of the 18th century. There exists a reference to a painter arriving at Ramdaspur (Amritsar) for the purpose of creating a portrait of Guru Hargobind. In the Roopa-lekha commissioned by Ram Rai, the eldest son of Har Rai, there exists portraits of the Sikh gurus from Nanak to Har Rai by a Mughal artist. This work was completed before 1688, the year that Ram Rai passed away. Various contemporary paintings of Guru Gobind Singh dating to the late 1600's gives evidence of accomplished artists of the time working under Sikh patronage.

Conservation 

Many priceless Sikh heritage sites (including their architecture and artwork) have been destroyed or altered beyond recognition under the guise of "kar seva" renovations by various institutions and groups in recent-times. An example of these haphazard and destructive renovations is an incident involving some of the frescoes at Gurdwara Baba Atal, which were replaced with bathroom tiles and plaster by kar seva groups. Many groups are rushing to digitize what remains for posterity before they are lost, such as Panjab Digital Library.

Cultural societies of the Sikhs

There is a common misconception that all Sikhs belong to the Punjab region.  The religion's birthplace of Punjab itself has been called "India’s melting pot", and many other parts of Northern India due to the heavy influence of invading cultures, such as Mughal and Persian, that mirrors the confluence of rivers from which the region gets its name(from Persian,"panj" پنج meaning "five" and "-āb" آب meaning water thus meaning land of the five waters).  Thus, Sikh culture is to a large extent as a result by groups of various cultures uniting together, thus forming a unique one.

Sikhism has forged a unique form of architecture which Bhatti describes as being "inspired by Guru Nanak’s creative mysticism" such that Sikh architecture "is a mute harbinger of holistic humanism based on pragmatic spirituality".  The keynote of Sikh architecture is the Gurdwara which is the personification of the "melting pot" of Indian cultures, full of Mughal, Aryan and Persian influences.
The reign of the Sikh Empire was the single biggest catalyst in the creation of a uniquely Sikh form of expression, with Maharajah Ranjit Singh patronising the building of forts, palaces, bungas (residential places), colleges, etc. that can be said to be of the Sikh Style.  The "jewel in the crown" of the Sikh Style is the Harmandir Sahib.

Sikh culture and identity is heavily influenced by militaristic motifs, with Khanda being the most obvious; thus it is no surprise that the majority of Sikh artifacts, independent of the relics of the Gurus, have a military theme.  This motif is again evident in the Sikh festivals of Hola Mohalla and Vasakhi which feature marching and practicing displays of valor, respectively.

The art, culture, identity and society of the Sikhs has been merged with the different localities and ethnicities of different Sikhs into categories such as 'Agrahari Sikhs', 'Dakhni Sikhs' and 'Assamese Sikhs'; however there has emerged a niche cultural phenomenon that can be described as 'Political Sikh'.  The art of prominent diaspora Sikhs such as Amarjeet Kaur Nandhra, and Amrit and Rabindra Kaur Singh (The Singh Twins), is partly informed by their Sikh spirituality and influence.

Culture of Sikh communities
Dusenbery (2014) states that Punjabi Sikhs form the majority of the Sikh population. He notes that "some Sindhis and other South Asians have been affiliated at the margins as Nanakpanthis (‘followers of Nanak’s path’) or Sehajdhari (‘slow adopter’) Sikhs" but in the main, "the Sikh Panth has remained largely a Punjabi affair".  However, the Sikh community is varied and includes people who speak the Pashto language, the Sindhi language, the Telugu language and many more. The many communities following Sikhism are detailed below.

Afghani Sikhs

The Sikhs of Afghanistan have a unique culture which has elements of the culture of Afghanistan. Tatla (2014) states that there were 3,000 Sikhs in Afghanistan in his book The Sikh Diaspora which was published in 2014.

American Sikhs

Yogi Bhajan is credited with raising awareness of Sikhism amongst the non-Asian community of the United States of America. This community is known as the white Sikh community which practices Sikhism and maintains a distinct culture.

Assamese Sikhs

The presence of Sikhism has been existing in Assam for over 200 years. The community traces its origins to the times of Maharaja Ranjit Singh who took his army to Assam and put some influence of the religion towards the locals. According to the 2001 census, there were 22,519 Sikhs in Assam, out of which 4,000 are Assamese Sikhs.

Assamese Sikhs follow the Sikh religion and celebrate Sikh festivals. They also celebrate cultural festivals such as Magh Bihu and wear traditional Assamese dress. Their language is the Assamese language.

Agrahari Sikhs

Agrahari Sikh is a Sikh community found in eastern India including the states of West Bengal, Bihar and Jharkhand. Agrahari Sikhs, also known as Bihari Sikhs, have existed for centuries in Bihar and Jharkhand.

Bihari Sikhs share their culture with the local Bihari community. The men generally wear the local dhoti and women wear the sari. They also celebrate cultural festivals such as the Chath festival.

Dakhni Sikhs

Dakhni Sikhs are from the Deccan Plateau in India located within the states of Maharashtra, Telegana and Andhra Pradesh. The traditional dress of women is the sari. The native languages of Dakhni Sikhs include Marathi and Telugu.

Kashmiri Sikhs
Ethnic Kashmiri Sikhs speak the Kashmiri language and observe Kashmiri culture. They trace their religious heritage to the influence of Sikh soldiers who settled in Kashmir under the Maharaja Ranjit Singh rule in 1819. However, the soldiers permanently settled in Kashmir.

Punjabi Sikhs

Punjabi Sikhs follow the Punjabi culture. Their traditional dress includes the Punjabi Salwar Suit, Punjabi Tamba and Kurta, Punjabi juti and Patiala salwar.

In addition to the Sikh festivals  using the Nanakshahi calendar, Punjabi Sikhs observe traditional Punjabi festivals using the Punjabi calendar.

Sindhi Sikhs

In addition to celebrating Sikh festivals, Sindhi Sikhs celebrate cultural festivals such as Cheti Chand, the Sindhi new year. Sindhi Sikhs speak the Sindhi language.

South Indian Sikhs

There are Sikh communities in Karnataka, Andhra Pradesh and Maharashtra who converted to Sikhism centuries ago.

The Sikhs comprise Banjara and Satnami. The process of blending the religion into southern India for the Sikligars began at the time of 10th Sikh Guru Gobind Singh, who came to the Deccan and died in 1708 at Nanded (Maharashtra).

It all came by the Sikligars as they cane to southern India as expert arms-making camp followers of the tenth Guru. Sikligar is a compound of the Persian words `saiqal` and `gar` meaning a polisher of metal. The traditional occupation of the Sikligars is crafting kitchen implements.

Banjaras are a nomadic tribe who traditionally travelled with merchandise and are found across a large swathe of northern India, as well as in the south. Sikh Banjaras too travelled with armies of the past supplying them with provisions.

Gallery

See also 
Pahari painting
Kangra painting
Rajput painting
Mughal painting
Indian art
Turban training centre
Sikh architecture
Sikh scriptures
History of Sikhism
Punjabi culture
Shastar Vidya
Sikh chola
Sikh Ajaibghar
Mehdiana Sahib

References and notes 

Art movements
Sikh culture